Events from the year 1698 in Sweden

Incumbents
 Monarch – Charles XII

Events

 
 

 
 12 May - Wedding between Hedvig Sophia of Sweden and Frederick IV, Duke of Holstein-Gottorp on Karlberg Palace.
 Summer - The king and his brother-in-law engage in the Gottorp Fury, which scandalizes the country.

Births

 August - Samuel Klingenstierna, scientist  (died 1765) 
 28 November - Charlotta Frölich, historian and agronomist  (died 1770) 
 - Lovisa von Burghausen, memoir writer, famed for her slave narrative (died 1733)

Deaths
 February - Anna Åkerhielm, archaeological writer and traveler   (born 1642) 
 23 October - David Klöcker Ehrenstrahl, painter  (born 1628)

References

 
Years of the 17th century in Sweden
Sweden